PizzaExpress Jazz Club is a jazz club in London, England. Based in Dean Street in Soho, it is situated in the basement of a PizzaExpress restaurant, and was opened by company founder Peter Boizot in 1969. It has played host to
Norah Jones, Amy Winehouse, Jamie Cullum and Walter Smith III

Although the current building was built in 1878, the site was previously occupied by the Dispensary for Diseases of the Ear. Founded in 1816 by a Naval surgeon, John Harrison Curtis (1778–1860), the Dispensary for Diseases of the Ear – the first ear hospital in the UK if not in Europe. – opened at 20 Carlisle Street under the patronage of the Prince Regent (later George IV). Shortly after this it moved to 10 Dean Street in Soho. By 1845 it was known as the Royal Ear Hospital. When larger premises were needed, it moved to 66 Firth Street in 1876, then in 1904 to 42–43 Dean Street in purpose-built premises. Mr Curtis divided opinion at the time, being known as a "great aurist" and a "quack" in equal measure, as illustrated by the story of his "treatment" of Robert Peel.

The  club was founded as the PizzaExpress Jazz Room, and early on featured UK pianists like Brian Lemon and Lennie Felix. In May 1975, the venue presented their first American jazz star, the saxophonist Bud Freeman, and other early visitors included Buddy Tate, Bob Wilber, Al Grey, Benny Carter, Ruby Braff, and Snub Mosley, who recorded an album Live At Pizza Express at the club in 1978. From 1980, the club had its own house band made up of top UK mainstream players including Digby Fairweather, Danny Moss and Tommy Whittle, known as the PizzaExpress All Stars.

Over the years the club has gone on to feature many prominent jazz musicians. Yank Lawson, Al Haig, John Dankworth, Red Norvo, Tal Farlow, Trummy Young, Jay McShann, Al Cohn, Kenny Baker, Dick Morrissey, Jimmy McPartland, and others appeared during the 1980s. When Peter Boizot sold the PizzaExpress company in 1993, the jazz club survived the transition, and over the next two decades presented the first UK performances of Diana Krall, Norah Jones, Kurt Elling, Brad Mehldau and e.s.t. Jamie Cullum performed at the venue with representatives from Universal and Sony sat on either side of the stage waiting to sign him.

Over the years, the PizzaExpress music policy expanded beyond Dean Street, with high-profile artists appearing at PizzaExpress Maidstone and Pizza on the Park especially. The Dean Street venue has been associated with numerous festivals including the PizzaExpress Jazz Festival (1979–1981), the London Latin Jazz Festival (2012–present) the Soho Jazz Festival (1986–2002), the Steinway Festival (2009–present), the Revoice Festival (2010–2014) and the London Catalan Festival (2018–present).

References

External links
 Official website
  Jazz Services: Pizza Express Jazz Club
 London History 21 May 2013.

1969 establishments in England
Music venues in London
Jazz clubs in London